Mohamad Fares may refer to:

 Mohamad Fares (footballer born 1990), Syrian footballer
 Mohamed Salim Fares (b. 1996), Algerian footballer